Shiromani Akali Dal (Amritsar) is separatist political party led by Simranjit Singh Mann, it is a splinter group of the Shiromani Akali Dal. Shiromani Akali Dal (Amritsar) was formed on the 1st of May 1994.

Electoral success
The party's most significant success was in the 1989 Indian general elections when they won 6 out of the 13 seats in Punjab. The party espouses the ideology of Punjabiyat and Sikh nationalism. Moreover, the party won the parliamentary seat of Sangrur in 1999 and the 2022 Sangrur (by-elections). Upon winning the seat in 2022, Simranjit Singh Mann gave credit to Jarnail Singh Bhindranwale. Also, Mann emphasized his priority will be to "work with the Punjab government" to "raise the poor economic condition of Sangrur including the condition of farmers under debt".

The party contested the SGPC elections on the same plank and won three seats.

History and ideology

Akali politics in post-colonial India have organized around advancing and protecting Sikh political and cultural interests and Punjabi language. By 1973, the Akali's adopted the Anandpur Sahib Resolution a document which advanced a desire for increasing regional autonomy within India's centralized structure of governance, as well as various socio political conerens.

From 1975 to 1977, the president of India, Indira Gandhi would institute a state of emergency suspending elections and civil liberties. During the early phases of the emergency, Akali and Sikh parties would meet in Amritsar to resist the "fascist tendency of the Congress". The Akali Dal would launch the "Campaign to Save Democracy". However, the period would see widespread human rights abuses including the mass detention of dissidents and opposition; forced sterilizations; constitutional modifications; demolition of homes and displacement of people and suspension of the press.

Following the end of the emergency from 1977 to 1984, the Akali Dal would be re-elected in Punjab and constitute the main opposition to the Indira Gandhi-led Congress government. The period would see an increase in Punjabi nationalism. The party would continue to organize around the adoption of the Anandpur Sahib Resolution. The central government would treat the Anandpur Sahib Resolution as a secessionist document, eventually culminating in Operation Blue Star, an invasion of Harmindar Sahib on June 1, 1984. The operation would result in mass civilian casualties and precipitate an insurgency in Punjab for the formation of Khalistan. The Khalistan movement would be brutally suppressed by the central Indian state leading to mass human rights violations including extrajudicial executions, torture, and mass detention.

On May 1, 1994, the Shiromani Akali Dal (Amritsar) would split from the traditional Shiromani Akali Dal. While there are overlaps in ideology between the two parties, the Shiromani Akali Dal (Amritsar) remains more radical than its predecessor. The party continues to advocate for the formation of Khalistan and increasing the autonomy of the state of Punjab. Moreover, the party continues to advocate for the Anandpur Sahib Resolution which proposed several religious, economic and political aims for the state of Punjab. The party opposes the Sutlej Yamuna Link canal noting the canal violates the state's riparian water rights and will accelerate ongoing desertification. The party has also been critical of extrajudicial killings, torture and genocide of Sikhs by governmental authorities in the 1980-90s.

Anandpur Sahib Resolution

In short, the Anandpur Sahib Resolution aimed to: reiterate the separateness of the Sikh tradition from Hinduism; increase the devolution of power from the central government to the states, to provide states with more autonomy; eradicate poverty and starvation through increased production and a more equitable distribution of wealth and also the establishment of a just social order sans exploitation of any kind; remove discrimination on the basis of caste, creed or any other ground; and combat disease and ill health by reducing the use of intoxicants and provision of full facilities for the growth of physical well-being.

References

External links
Official Site of the Shiromani Akali Dal (Amritsar)

Political parties in Punjab, India
Sikh politics
Amritsar
Political parties established in 1994
1994 establishments in Punjab, India
Shiromani Akali Dal